The 1998 Stockholm Open was an ATP men's tennis tournament played on indoor hard courts and held at the Kungliga tennishallen in Stockholm, Sweden. It was the 30th edition of the event and part of the ATP International Series of the 1998 ATP Tour. The tournament was held from 9 November through 15 November 1998. Unseeded Todd Martin won the singles title.

Finals

Singles

 Todd Martin defeated  Thomas Johansson, 6–3, 6–4, 6–4
 It was Martin's 2nd singles title of the year and the 7th of his career.

Doubles

 Nicklas Kulti /  Mikael Tillström defeated  Chris Haggard /  Peter Nyborg, 7–5, 3–6, 7–5

References

External links
  
  
 Association of Tennis Professionals (ATP) tournament profile

 
Stockholm Open
Stockholm Open
Stockholm Open
Stockholm Open
1990s in Stockholm